West Vancouver—Sunshine Coast—Sea to Sky Country (formerly West Vancouver—Sunshine Coast) is a federal electoral district in British Columbia, Canada, that has been represented in the House of Commons of Canada since 1997.

Geography
The district includes the regional districts of Sunshine Coast, the southern portion of the Squamish–Lillooet Regional District, including the municipalities of Whistler, Squamish, Pemberton; and West Vancouver, Lions Bay and Bowen Island, which are in the Metro Vancouver Regional District.

Demographics

According to the Canada 2016 Census; 2013 representation

Languages: 76.9% English, 4.4% Mandarin, 3.8% Persian, 2.4% French, 1.9% German, 1.0% Punjabi,
Religions (2011): 42.4% Christian (13.3% Catholic, 8.6% Anglican, 6.8% United Church, 1.6% Baptist, 1.5% Lutheran, 1.1% Presbyterian, 9.5% Other), 3.3% Muslim, 1.3% Buddhist, 1.0% Jewish, 1.0% Sikh, 49.3% No religion 
Median income (2015): $35,774 
Average income (2015): $65,168

History
The electoral district was created as "West Vancouver–Sunshine Coast" in 1996 from parts of Capilano—Howe Sound and North Island—Powell River ridings.

In 2003, it was renamed "West Vancouver—Sunshine Coast—Sea to Sky Country". At 48 characters, this was the current longest riding name in Canada until 2015, when it was overtaken by the renamed, 49-character Leeds—Grenville—Thousand Islands and Rideau Lakes.

The riding or electoral district is also the first to have been represented in Parliament by a member of the Green Party, Blair Wilson. Elected as part of the Liberal party, he crossed the floor later in his career to become a member of the Green Party representing West Vancouver—Sunshine Coast—Sea to Sky Country. However, this came immediately before the 2008 federal election, in which he was defeated, and he never had the opportunity to sit in the House as a Green MP.

The 2012 federal electoral boundaries redistribution concluded that the electoral boundaries of West Vancouver—Sunshine Coast—Sea to Sky Country should be adjusted, and a modified electoral district of the same name would be contested in future elections. The redefined West Vancouver—Sunshine Coast—Sea to Sky Country:
loses the Powell River Regional District to the district of North Island—Powell River;
regains the community of Pemberton and area that had been transferred from it to Chilliwack—Fraser Canyon in the previous redistribution; and
sees its boundary with North Vancouver adjusted to correspond to the boundaries between the District of North Vancouver, West Vancouver and the Capilano Indian Reserve.
These new boundaries were legally defined in the 2013 representation order, which came into effect upon the call of the 42nd Canadian federal election, scheduled for October 2015.

Members of Parliament

This riding has elected the following Members of Parliament:

Current Member of Parliament
Patrick Weiler is the current Member of Parliament for this riding. He was elected after the incumbent, Pamela Goldsmith-Jones chose not to run for re-election in the 2019 federal election.

Former Members of Parliament

The first Member of Parliament to represent the riding was John Reynolds, a former sales and marketing consultant. He was first elected in the 1997 election. He was a member of the Reform Party, and its successors the Canadian Alliance and the Conservative Party. He served as a member on the Standing Committee on Procedure and House Affairs. Reynolds did not run in the 2006 general election.

Liberal Blair Wilson was elected in the 2006 federal election. Wilson, a chartered accountant and a former restaurant owner, was the first Liberal MP for the historically Conservative riding. He lost to former MP John Reynolds in the 2004 federal election. Wilson resigned from caucus in October 2007 after allegations of improper campaign spending and failure to mention several legal and financial troubles during three nomination vetting processes. He remained a Liberal but not in caucus. In January 2008, Wilson became an Independent. He then joined the Green Party on August 30, 2008, becoming its first MP. Running under the Green banner in the election called only days later, he was defeated by Conservative John Weston. John Weston was defeated by Pamela Goldsmith-Jones on October 19, 2015.In the 2019 federal election, Patrick Weiler won for the Liberals after Goldsmith-Jones did not run for re-election.

Election results

West Vancouver—Sunshine Coast—Sea to Sky Country

West Vancouver—Sunshine Coast

See also
 List of Canadian federal electoral districts
 Past Canadian electoral districts

Notes

References

Sources

 Library of Parliament Riding Profile (1996–2003)
 Library of Parliament Riding Profile (2003–present)
 Expenditures – 2004
 Expenditures – 2000
 Expenditures – 1997

External links
 Parliament of Canada
 Politwitter
 Project Democracy
 Pundit's Guide
 StatsCan District Profile

British Columbia federal electoral districts
Federal electoral districts in Greater Vancouver and the Fraser Valley
Bowen Island
Lions Bay
Powell River, British Columbia
Squamish, British Columbia
West Vancouver
Whistler, British Columbia